Maddock is a Welsh surname. 
Maddock is the anglicised spelling of 'Madog', which originates from the ancient Welsh male given name 'Matoc', a diminutive of 'mad' meaning 'fortunate' or 'good'.
There are many variations to the name, including Maddocks, Maddox, Maddick, Mattock, Mattack, Maddog, Madog, and Madoc.

Notable people with the surname include:

Alfred Maddock (1917-2009), English inorganic chemist, radiochemist and spectroscopist
Bea Maddock (1934-2016), Australian artist
Chris Maddock (born 1977-78), American stand-up comedian
Diana Maddock, Baroness Maddock (1945-2020), British politician
Harold Russell Maddock (1918 - 2014), Australian race jockey
Hopkin Maddock (1881–1921), Welsh international rugby union player
Ieuan Maddock (1917-1988), Welsh nuclear researcher
Joe Maddock (disambiguation), multiple people
Kenneth Maddock (1937-2003), Australian anthropologist
Shirley Maddock (1928-2001), New Zealand television producer
Thomas Herbert Maddock (1792-1870), English MP
Walter Maddock (1880-1951), briefly governor of North Dakota in the 1920s

See also
Madoc (disambiguation)
Maddox (disambiguation)

References